Doronicum plantagineum, the plantain-leaved leopard's-bane or plantain false leopardbane, is a European plant species in the sunflower family. It is native to southeastern Europe from Greece and Italy to Ukraine and the Czech Republic. There are reports of the species being naturalized in the State of Oregon in the northwestern United States.

Doronicum plantagineum is a perennial herb up to 80 cm (2 feet) tall. Leaves are roundish, up to 11 cm (4.4 inches) long. The plant creates yellow flower heads one at a time, each up to 5 cm (2 inches) in diameter and containing both fay florets and disc florets.

Subspecies
Doronicum plantagineum subsp. atlanticum (Rouy) Greuter
Doronicum plantagineum subsp. emarginatum (H.J.Coste) P.Fourn.
Doronicum plantagineum subsp. plantagineum
Doronicum plantagineum subsp. tournefortii (Rouy) Cout.

The Latin specific epithet plantagineum refers to the leaves of the plant which are similar to those of a plantain.

References

Senecioneae
Plants described in 1753
Flora of Europe
Taxa named by Carl Linnaeus